The Grand Hamad Stadium, also known as the Al–Arabi Sports Club Stadium, is a multi-purpose stadium in Doha, Qatar. The stadium holds 13,000 people, and is currently used mostly for football matches, as it is Al-Arabi SC's home ground. The stadium was used extensively during the 2006 Asian Games, and was a venue for several different sports, including football, table tennis, rugby sevens, and fencing. The Iraq national football team played their 2014 FIFA World Cup qualification (AFC) matches at the stadium, as did the Yemen national football team in their 2018 FIFA World Cup qualification (AFC) matches. The architect was Michael KC Cheah. On March 10, 2022 the Brazil national football team announced that the Grand Hamad Stadium was selected as the team base camp during the 2022 FIFA World Cup.

FIFA World Cup qualification matches
FIFA World Cup qualification matches that were held in the stadium:

Friendly (national team) Matches
Friendly (national Team) Matches that were held in the stadium.

References

External links

Grand Hamad Stadium – goalzz.com

Football venues in Qatar
Sports venues in Doha
Multi-purpose stadiums in Qatar
Al-Arabi SC (Qatar)